Roadhouse may refer to:

Film 
 Road House (1928 film), an American silent drama 
 Road House (1934 film), a British comedy crime film
 Road House (1948 film), an American film noir 
 Road House (1989 film), an American action film 
 Road House 2, a 2006 sequel 
 Road House (upcoming film), a remake of the 1989 film
 Roadhouse 66, a 1984 American film

Music 
 Roadhouse (band), a British rock band
 Roadhouse (Ruth Cameron album), 1999
 Roadhouse, a 1988 album by John Cafferty and the Beaver Brown Band
 "Road House", a song by the Flamin' Groovies' on the 1970 album Flamingo

Plays
 Road House (play), a 1932 work by Walter C. Hackett

Other uses
 Roadhouse (premises), a mixed-use premises to service passing travellers
 Receiving house, or roadhouse, a theatre for touring theatre companies
 The Roadhouse, an American radio station

See also

 "Roadhouse Blues", a 1970 song by The Doors
 Logan's Roadhouse, an American restaurant chain
 Roadhouse Grill, an American restaurant chain
 Texas Roadhouse, an American restaurant chain